General elections were held in Dominica in November 1934.

Electoral system
The Legislative Council had 13 members, with the Administrator as President, six 'official' members (civil servants), four elected members and two appointed members. Candidacy for the elected seats was limited to people with an annual income of at least £200 or owning property valued at £500 or more.

Results

The appointed members were William James Ross Stebbings and Cecil Rawle.

References

Dominica
1934 in Dominica
Elections in Dominica
Dominica
Election and referendum articles with incomplete results
November 1935 events